Kagle is a surname. Notable people with the surname include:

Bob Kagle, American businessman
Eddie Kagle, character in Angel on My Shoulder (film)

See also
Cagle